In biology, the wonderful life theory, also known as contingency theory, postulates that after hundreds of different phyla evolved during the Cambrian period, many of them subsequently became extinct, leaving the relatively few phyla that exist today.  The theory was first suggested in 1989 by Stephen Jay Gould in his book Wonderful Life.

Evolutionary iconography 
In Wonderful Life, Stephen Jay Gould discusses the iconography of evolution in popular culture and the damaging effects of the march of progress on public understanding of the theory.

The march of progress, Gould argues, has led to the popular interpretation that the evolution of increased mental powers, ultimately culminating in the development of man’s complex brain, is the natural outcome of evolution. Thus, the term “Evolution” is often conflated with a linear progression of life towards ever-increasing mental powers and a “comfortable view of human inevitability and superiority.” Gould argues that the definition of Evolution to professional biologists is “adaptation to changing environments”, not progress, and that the composition of life on the planet is rather a “copiously branching bush, continually pruned by the grim reaper of extinction, not a ladder of predictable progress.” In an error that Gould refers to as “life’s little joke”, he discusses society’s obsession with unsuccessful lineages as “textbook cases” of “evolution”. To elaborate, we consistently seek out “a single line of advance from the true topology of copious branching. In this misguided effort, we are inevitably drawn to branches so near the brink of total annihilation that they retain only one surviving twig. We then view this twig as the acme of upward achievement, rather than the probable last grasp of a richer ancestry.” Gould uses the evolution of the horse to illustrate this point, as the unbroken connection between Hyracotherium (formerly called Eohippus) and Equus provides an apparent linear path from simplicity to complexity. The only reason the evolution of horses has become the canonical representation of progressive evolution is because their bush has been extremely unsuccessful. Instead, Gould argues, we should look to bats, antelopes, and rodents as champions of mammalian evolution as they present us with “thousands of twigs on a vigorous bush” and are the true embodiments of evolutionarily successful groups.

The cone vs the pyramid 
Gould argues that the conventional view of evolution, as illustrated by the cone of increasing diversity, is flawed. It is typically assumed that early life is restricted in form, and from this restriction of form follows diversification into the variety of animal life that currently exists. This cone can be visualized as an inverted Christmas tree, with a narrow base and numerous branches proliferating outward into the present day. Gould presents an alternative hypothesis, however, which states that the history of life is better described as “decimation followed by diversification within a few remaining stocks”, represented as a pyramid with a wide base of anatomical disparity that becomes increasingly constrained by natural selection and extinction level events as time moves forward. This is evidenced by the fact that the fossils excavated from the Burgess Shale in British Columbia represent a paleo-ecosystem with much greater anatomical disparity than currently exists and that fewer phyla exist today compared to the Cambrian seas. Gould offers the view that life during the Cambrian explosion quickly proliferated into the diversity of forms seen today due to the availability of numerous ecological niches and was subsequently decimated by extinction level events throughout geological time. He also notes that the survival of groups following extinction events bears no relationship to traditional notions of Darwinian success in normal times. For example,

Ultimately, Gould explains, both the false iconography of the march of progress and our allegiance to the cone of increasing diversity have led us astray in our thinking about trends in evolutionary biology.

Replaying the "Tape of Life" 
The central question proposed by Wonderful Life is that if life initially proliferated into a greater variety of phyla than currently exist and were subsequently decimated by the stochastic grim reaper of extinction, what then can be said about the inevitability of human intelligence and superiority? Additionally, Gould asks what role historical contingencies play in the evolution of life on Earth. It is these central ideas which prompt Gould to propose a thought experiment called “replaying the tape of life.” Its central essence is this: if we rewind the clock and replay the history of life on Earth numerous times, will we consistently see the same outcome that is the reality we experience today? The outcome of this thought experiment has two possible interpretations, elaborated by Gould,

Gould’s opinion, and the central argument of Wonderful Life, is that “any replay of the tape of life would lead evolution down a pathway radically different from the road actually taken.” Additionally, Gould argues, no outcome can be predicated from the start, but the resulting pattern that emerges after replaying the tape of life would be just as interpretable and logical as our current situation.

References 

Biology theories
Evolutionary biology